A snowskate is a hybrid of a skateboard and a snowboard, intended primarily to allow for skateboard-style tricks on the snow. There are many types depending on the brand or style of snowskate.

History and design 
The first snowskate traces its history to the Snurfer circa 1964. The Snurfer is considered to be the first snowboard to ever hit the market, but it could arguably be called the first snowskate, since it was without bindings. Joshua Luther first coined the phrase snowskate when he needed a way to get across town during a blizzard.

Around 1970, a product called the "Snow Skate" was sold in local toy and sporting good stores. They resembled the modern day Fuse snowskate. There were two ski-like apparatuses that were attached to the area around the truck of a skateboard, allowing the skateboard to move through the snow. The "Ski" portion of the snow skate is made of a hard plastic with rubber straps that went over the skateboard wheels to hold them together.  Other mentionable early snowskate brands were The "Skeeter" and the "Snodad". Designs of this early era ranged from two skiblades on the lower deck (Like the Skeeter) to four blades on the lower deck. Sometimes, the early snowskates used metal runners, similar to ice skate blades, enabling the snowskater to use the momentum to ride well.

The "Snodad" came about much later in time.  It was created by PNW skaters with the intent of riding fresh snow without bindings.  Unfortunately the demise of the company came shortly after its official launch. It exists only as a historical "tip of the hat" to these pioneers of snowboarding without bindings.

Modern snowskates 
Snowskates are now available in four varieties: the single deck variety, the bideck variety, the 4x4 variety, and the powderskate variety. All of the modern snowskates have either a waterproof top grip coating on the deck, or a textured deck to avoid slippage while riding.

Single deck 
Single deck Snowskates are usually made out of laminated wood with a plastic bottom or are made of solid plastic, There are grooves cut into the bottom of the board, usually 7 or 5. Single decks are preferred for riding in snowskate parks and urban terrain but can also be ridden down hills, however, they are rarely permitted on ski resorts. Snowskates of this kind are most suitable for winter skateboarding tricks.

Single deck snowskates first appeared on the market in 1998, manufactured by Premier Snowskates and marketed by Andy Wolf, former member of the Nitro snowboarding team. Today the primary manufacturers are: Ambition Snowskates, Icon Snowskates, LY Snow and Krown Skateboards.

Snowskate parks became numerous when the first single deck snowskates were being sold in stores. Word of mouth quickly spread about the single deck snowskate, leading to the popularity of snowskate parks around United States.

The snowskate park moved snowskating from an urban underground winter sport to a mainstream winter sport. With the introduction of the snowboard, many resorts have removed their snowskate parks, and snowskating has moved back to its underground winter sport roots.

Bideck 

A bideck snowskate is a snowskate that has a top skateboard deck which the rider stands on and a lower ski deck, which is in contact with the snow. Bidecks come in single blade varieties and multiple blade varieties. Bideck snowskates were reportedly invented by a Stevens Pass (Washington) local named Steve Frink. He came up with the idea of a skateboard with skis in 1994 while burning his skateboard in a skateboarders' ritual.  In the year 2001, after many prototypes, he completed a final and finished product which he marketed under the brand "Bi-Deck Snowskates".

Around the same time, snowboard manufacturer Burton Snowboards released the "Snowdeck". Burton has since stopped making snowskates. There are many bidecking skate communities in the world. Different bidecks are tailored to a different style of riding. Longer bidecks are favored for mountain snowskating, and shorter bidecks are favored for tricks and stunts. Current Bideck snowskate manufacturers are Hovland, Parole Boards, Squampton Snowskates (eco-friendly, made with hemp), Harfang, Ralston, Pioneer, Fuse, florilda powderskate, 0910, Minus-7, Landyachtz, Chiller, LibTech and Boyd Hill.

4x4 
The least common snowskate, 4x4 snowskates, provide the most skateboard like feel. They have four small skis, each replacing a wheel, and are generally a little fatter and longer than a normal skateboard.

Powderskate 
Powderskates are the most surf-like snowskate. They are usually longer and have a larger surface area to keep you afloat as it is used in deep powder. There are two varieties; single and bi-deck. The single deck is only for use in powder, and provides the most surf-like feel, whereas the bi-deck  provides more leverage, and can be used on and off the powder.

References 

Snowboarding
Boardsports